ExtraVision was a short-lived teletext service created and operated by the American television network CBS in the early to mid-1980s. It was carried in the vertical blanking interval of the video from local affiliate stations of the CBS network. It featured CBS program information, news, sports, weather, even subtitling for CBS programming (much like page 888 in British/European teletext, and American closed captioning). ExtraVision could also have its pages customized by the local affiliate station carrying it, for such things as program schedules, local community announcements, and station promotions.

ExtraVision was discontinued by CBS towards the end of the 1980s, due to the service using the NABTS protocol, which required a quite expensive decoder to receive the service. Also, most of the local CBS affiliates carrying the ExtraVision service did not bother to invest in the computer equipment required to customize pages to carry locally oriented information on the service.

CBS had begun tests in 1979 using the French Antiope system, and again in 1981 in the Los Angeles area. The full ExtraVision service began in April 1983 on CBS affiliate WBTV in Charlotte, NC, and went nationwide in 1984. It was cancelled in 1988, three years after NBC Teletext had also been abandoned by NBC.

References

External links
 Print advertisement for Extravision
 Ed Ellers, Teletext in the United States of America

CBS Television Network
Teletext
1981 establishments in California
1983 establishments in North Carolina
1984 establishments in the United States
1988 disestablishments in the United States
Products introduced in 1983
Products introduced in 1984
Products and services discontinued in 1988